"Sunset People" is a song by American singer Donna Summer from her seventh studio album Bad Girls (1979). It was released as a single in some countries in 1980.

Overview
Bad Girls, released on Casablanca Records in the US, had already produced several chart-topping singles for the disco star, but Summer had resigned from the label and taken a lawsuit against them. She had since signed to Geffen Records and was getting ready to release her first album with them (which had moved away from the disco sound). The single was not released in the North American market because of ongoing litigation.

The song was also used for the unsold 1985 game show pilot called Split Decision hosted by Jim McKrell.

Critical reception
Stephen Holden, in his review of the album Bad Girls for Rolling Stone, noted a large social subtext in the song, which describes the whole truth about the nightmarish underside of the glamorous world of Hollywood, about the inhabitants of the Sunset Strip at night.

Chart positions

Cover versions
The song was covered by E. G. Daily in 1985 for her debut album Wild Child.

References

External links
 

1979 songs
1980 singles
Donna Summer songs
E. G. Daily songs
Songs written by Harold Faltermeyer
Songs written by Pete Bellotte
Casablanca Records singles
Songs written by Keith Forsey
Hi-NRG songs
Song recordings produced by Giorgio Moroder